Raphitoma stanici is a species of sea snail, a marine gastropod mollusk in the family Raphitomidae.

Description
The length of the shell attains 14.3 mm.

Distribution
This marine species occurs in the Croatian part of the Adriatic Sea.

References

External links
 http://zoosystema.com/42/16 Prkić J., Giannuzzi-Savelli R., Pusateri F., Russini V., Fassio G. & Oliverio M. (2020). Three new species of Raphitoma Bellardi, 1847 (Mollusca, Gastropoda, Raphitomidae) from Croatian waters (NE Adriatic Sea). Zoosystema. 42(16): 215-237

stanici
Gastropods described in 2020